Jennifer Clare Tomlinson (née Mills)  (born 10 August 1961) has been Archdeacon of Birmingham, England, since 2019.

Early life
Tomlinson was educated at Humphrey Perkins School up to the age of 16 and took her A levels at Rawlins Academy in Quorn, Leicestershire. She attended St Bartholomew's Church, Quorn.

She studied history at Trinity Hall, Cambridge.

Church
She was ordained after a period of study at Ridley Hall, Cambridge. Her first posts were curacies in Godalming. She was a hospital chaplain at Thurrock from 1998 to 2009; and Bishop's Adviser on Women's Ministry from 2008 until  her appointment as Archdeacon.

Personal life
She married in 1993, and has two daughters.

References

1972 births
Living people
Alumni of Trinity Hall, Cambridge
21st-century English Anglican priests
20th-century English Anglican priests
Alumni of Ridley Hall, Cambridge
Archdeacons of Birmingham
People from Quorn, Leicestershire